Iñaki Garmendia Larrea (born 18 August 1981) is a Spanish former footballer who played as a right back.

He spent most of his 16-year senior career in the lower leagues. His professional input consisted of 29 Segunda División matches with Mirandés, in the 2012–13 season.

Club career
Garmendia was born in Vitoria-Gasteiz, Álava. After starting out at SCD Durango, he spent the vast majority of his career in the Segunda División B, representing Deportivo Alavés' reserves, CF Extremadura and Real Jaén. In 2008–09 he moved down to the Tercera División, and joined Amurrio Club.

On 21 July 2009, Garmendia signed a contract with CD Mirandés of the third division. He contributed 28 games (all starts) and two goals in his third season, as the Castile and León-based team promoted to Segunda División for the first time in its history.

On 17 August 2012, one day shy of his 31st birthday, Garmendia made his debut in the second tier, starting in a 0–1 home loss against SD Huesca. He left the club the following year, and joined SD Amorebieta in division three.

Garmendia moved to amateurs CD Aurrerá de Vitoria – also in his native region – in the summer of 2017.

References

External links

1981 births
Living people
Footballers from Vitoria-Gasteiz
Spanish footballers
Association football defenders
Segunda División players
Segunda División B players
Tercera División players
Deportivo Alavés B players
CF Extremadura footballers
Real Jaén footballers
Amurrio Club footballers
CD Mirandés footballers
SD Amorebieta footballers
CD Aurrerá de Vitoria footballers